Huizhou South railway station is a railway station located in Huizhou City, Guangdong Province, China, on the Xiamen-Shenzhen Railway operated by the Guangzhou Railway (Group) Corp., China Railway Corporation.

Railway stations in Guangdong